František Pecháček (15 February 1896 – 3 February 1944) was a Czech gymnast who competed for Czechoslovakia in the 1920 Summer Olympics. He was born in Záhornice near Městec Králové and was murdered in Mauthausen-Gusen concentration camp.

In 1920 he was a member of the Czechoslovak gymnastic team which finished fourth in the team event.

References

External links
short biography and another poster from the exhibition Under Sokol's Wings held in the Army Museum Žižkov from June to December 2012.

1896 births
1944 deaths
People from Nymburk District
People from the Kingdom of Bohemia
Czech male artistic gymnasts
Czechoslovak male artistic gymnasts
Olympic gymnasts of Czechoslovakia
Gymnasts at the 1920 Summer Olympics
Czechoslovak civilians killed in World War II
Czech people executed in Nazi concentration camps
People who died in Mauthausen concentration camp
Sportspeople from the Central Bohemian Region